Nicolas Munoz is a French professional rugby league footballer who played in the 2000s and 2010s. He played for Lézignan Sangliers of the French Rugby League Championship, as well as a France international representative.

He has been named in the France training squad for the 2008 Rugby League World Cup.

Munoz represented France in the 2010 European Cup.

References

French rugby league players
Lézignan Sangliers players
France national rugby league team players
Spain national rugby league team players
Living people
Year of birth missing (living people)